George Ishiyama (1914–2003) was a Japanese-American businessman who was president of Alaska Pulp Corporation (APC) in Sitka, Alaska between 1983 and 2003.

Biography
Ishiyama was born and raised in Los Angeles, California, and graduated in Economics from the University of California at Los Angeles in 1936. He and his family were interned during World War II at camps in Utah and Wyoming following the signing of Executive Order 9066. However, because Ishiyama determined ways to improve camps operations he was assigned to work in Washington, D.C., with the Department of Interior which had charge of the camps.

After the war, Ishiyama traveled to Japan to assist in its rebuilding, and to assist in mutual understanding between the United States and Japan. This became a constant theme of his life.

Ishiyama first established himself as a businessman in Japan, and in 1960, he arranged for the sale of liquefied natural gas from the Phillips/Marathon plant on the Kenai Peninsula to Japan. This contract enabled the plant to be built. In the 1970s, Ishiyama was a key leader in reclaiming and developing Tokyo Bay.

In 1976, Ishiyama arranged for a high level trade mission to Alaska headed up by Toshio Doko, then the head of Japan's most powerful business group, the Keidenren.

In 1982, Ishiyama took the lead in attempting to arrange for the export of Alaska oil to Japan.

In 1983, Ishiyama became President of Alaska Pulp Corporation.

Awards
In 1991, his contributions to the promotion of mutual understanding and business relationships between Japan and other countries was recognized when he was awarded the Medal of Honor, and was named to the distinguished Order of the Rising Sun by the Emperor of Japan.

Tributes
In honor of his contributions to the City of Wrangell, a street was named after him.
On February 22, 2003, Alaskan Governor Frank Murkowski announced the creation of a state holiday (George Ishiyama Day)

References

External links 
 Tribute by Gov. Frank Murkowski
 One of George's Act of Kindness is highlighted in "The Story" by NPR on May 29, 2009

1914 births
2003 deaths
American manufacturing businesspeople
Japanese-American internees
American people of Japanese descent
Businesspeople from Los Angeles
20th-century American philanthropists
20th-century American businesspeople